Nestlé Canada Building is a 21-floor office tower with  of space near North York Centre in Toronto, Ontario, Canada.

Built in 1994 at the corner of Beecroft Road and Sheppard Avenue West, the building is home to Swiss-based Nestlé's Canadian corporate operations, Nestlé Canada. It has underground access to the Sheppard-Yonge (TTC) station.

References
Nestle Canada Building

Buildings and structures in Toronto
Office buildings completed in 1994
North York
1994 establishments in Ontario